Timothy L. O'Brien (born 1961) is an American journalist, author and television commentator.

Early life and education
Born in Illinois, O'Brien is a graduate of Loyola Academy and Georgetown University, where he studied literature. He has three master's degrees from Columbia University, in history, journalism, and business.

Journalism career
O'Brien is the executive editor of Bloomberg Opinion, a platform that provides commentary about business, politics, and foreign affairs. O'Brien was a reporter for The New York Times before becoming editor of the paper's Sunday Business section in 2006. He was previously the executive editor of The Huffington Post and has been a staff writer for The Wall Street Journal and Talk. O'Brien edited a multi-part series on wounded war veterans that won a Pulitzer Prize for National Reporting in 2012. He is also a recipient of a Loeb Award for Distinguished Business Journalism. He helped oversee a team of New York Times reporters that was a 2009 Pulitzer Prize for Public Service finalist for its coverage of the 2008 financial crisis. O'Brien is also a contributing, on-air analyst with NBC/MSNBC where he frequently appears to discuss politics and national affairs.

Books
O'Brien has written two nonfiction books: 1998's Bad Bet: The Inside Story of the Glamour, Glitz, and Danger of America's Gambling Industry and 2005's TrumpNation: The Art of Being the Donald.TrumpNation is notable for its claim that celebrity real estate mogul Donald Trump was worth no more than US$250 million. Trump, who claimed at the time to be a billionaire and who has built a reputation upon his wealth, filed suit against O'Brien and Warner Books in 2006. In 2009, the suit was dismissed by a New Jersey judge. Trump appealed, but the dismissal was upheld by an appeals court in 2011. A novel by O'Brien, The Lincoln Conspiracy, was published in 2012.

Political career
In 2019, O'Brien was hired as a senior adviser for strategy and policy for Michael Bloomberg's Democratic Party primaries campaign in the 2020 United States presidential election.

References

External links
 Timothy L. O'Brien's website
 Timothy L. O'Brien's columns in "Bloomberg Opinion"
 Timothy L. O'Brien's stories in The New York Times

1961 births
Living people
The New York Times editors
The New York Times writers
American male journalists
Columbia Business School alumni
Georgetown University alumni
20th-century American journalists
MSNBC people
American political commentators
American political consultants